Elk Creek is an  tributary of Loyalsock Creek in Sullivan County, Pennsylvania in the United States.

Elk Creek joins Loyalsock Creek several miles below Forksville.

See also
List of rivers of Pennsylvania

References

Rivers of Pennsylvania
Rivers of Sullivan County, Pennsylvania
Tributaries of Loyalsock Creek